Mascot is a suburb in the Inner-South of Sydney, in the state of New South Wales, Australia. Mascot is located 7 kilometres south of the Sydney central business district and is one of the administrative centres of the Bayside Council. A small part of Mascot is located in the Inner West Council. Mascot is on the north-west side of Botany Bay and contains Sydney Airport.

History 

The first land grants in the area were made in 1835, with market gardening being the main land use. Subdivision followed the construction of Botany Road in 1875 and a municipality known as North Botany was formed in 1888. A racecourse operated in this area in 1904 on land that was formerly owned by the Australian Golf Club. The race course was known as Ascot, named after its famous counterpart in England. Residents wanted the area to have an individual identity and a referendum was held in 1911 to choose between Ascot, and Booralee. An objection from the postal authorities to the use of 'Ascot' led the council to alter the name to Mascot.

In 1920, Mascot was chosen as the site of a public airfield. Nigel Love was leasing  from the Kensington Race club and in 1921 the Commonwealth Government purchased  for this purpose. The first regular flights began in 1924. The Cooks River was diverted away from the area in 1947–52 to provide more land for the airport.

Heritage listings 
Mascot has a number of heritage-listed sites, including: 1024 Botany Road: Botany Water Reserves and General Holmes Drive: Sewage Pumping Station 38

Commercial area 

Mascot has a mixture of residential, commercial and industrial areas. The main shopping centre is located on Botany Road. The area around Mascot railway station is being redeveloped to contain high-density commercial and residential developments. The Police Headquarters for the local Botany Bay Area Command is on Botany Road and Mascot Ambulance Station is situated directly opposite. Mascot Fire Station is located in Coward Street, beside the City of Botany Bay Council Chambers.

Sydney Airport, Australia's principal airport, is an influential presence and key employer. The head office of Qantas is the Qantas Centre at 203 Coward Street in Mascot. There is also a number of airport hotels in the suburb.

Transport 
Mascot is serviced by a number of bus routes, which are operated by Transdev John Holland and Transit Systems. Routes 303, 306, 310 and 350, routes travel down Botany Road. Routes 343 and 356 services travel down Gardeners Road and route 305 departs from the Qantas Centre.

The suburb is served by three railway stations on the Airport & South Line. Mascot railway station is located in the residential and business area of the suburb. The International and Domestic railway stations are situated below the respective terminals of the airport. The Sydenham to Botany branch of the Metropolitan Goods railway line passes through the suburb and includes a yard in Mascot.

Recent improvements to Kingsford-Smith Airport have resulted in the creation of a bicycle path between Mascot (Coward Street) and the M5 East Freeway at Arncliffe. Other bike paths pass through Mascot to Botany Bay, the University of New South Wales and the Sydney CBD.

Population 

The most common foreign countries of birth were China 10.6%, Indonesia 6.6%, Philippines 2.7%, India 2.2% and United Kingdom 2.0%. Some 42.9% of people only spoke English at home. Other languages spoken at home included Mandarin 10.7%, Indonesian 6.7%, Cantonese 3.9%, Greek 3.9% and Spanish 2.8%. The most common responses for religion were No Religion 27.6% and Catholic 26.8%. Of occupied private dwellings in Mascot, 60.7% were flats or apartments; 31.9% were separate houses; and 6.4% were semi-detached, row- or terrace houses, townhouses etc.

The Australian Test cricketer and rugby league player Ray Lindwall was born in Mascot.

Politics 
Mascot is in the safe Labor federal electoral division of Kingsford Smith, which has been held by Matt Thistlethwaite since 2013.

Mascot is in the safe Labor state electorate of Heffron, which has been held by Ron Hoenig since 2012.

Schools 
Mascot Public School is a primary school in King Street and J. J. Cahill Memorial High School is located in Sutherland Street.

St Therese School Mascot is located in Sutherland Street.

Gardeners Road Primary school is on the Rosebery side of Gardeners Road, but attracts a number of students from Mascot.

Places of worship 
 Knox Presbyterian Church built in 1911 is located on Botany Road.
 Self-Realization Fellowship Sydney Centre is located on the corner of Kent Rd and Coward St.
 St Catherine's Greek Orthodox Church is located in Coward Street.

Parks and recreation 
L'Estrange Park is home to both the Mascot Kings (soccer) and the Mascot Juniors rugby league teams. Mascot Oval is the venue for the Mascot Juniors' home games. The Lakes Golf Club has hosted many international golf tournaments.

Gallery

Climate
Mascot has a humid subtropical climate (Cfa) with warm summers and mild winters. The area receives 104 clear days and 129 cloudy days annually.

References

External links 

Mascot - Sydney.com

 
Suburbs of Sydney